Miljan Goljović (born August 27, 1971) is a retired Slovenian professional basketball player. He was a 2.03 m tall small forward, that was a remarkable talent on offense.

Club career
Goljović was the Top Scorer of the EuroLeague 1999–00 season, as a player of Pivovarna Laško, averaging 20.2 points per game. He also played in the EuroLeague wearing the jersey of Ulkerspor.

Slovenian national team
Goljović was also a member of the senior Slovenian national basketball team.

Personal life
Goljović was born in Raška, Serbia. He acquired Slovenian citizenship following his move there, in 1994.

References

External links 
FIBA Profile
FIBA EuroLeague Profile
Euroleague.net Profile
Italian League Profile 
TBLStat.net Profile

1971 births
Living people
BSC Fürstenfeld Panthers players
BC Rytas players
KK Partizan players
KK Zlatorog Laško players
KK Sloga players
MENT B.C. players
Riesen Ludwigsburg players
People from Raška, Serbia
BKK Radnički players
Serbian expatriate basketball people in Austria
Serbian expatriate basketball people in Germany
Serbian expatriate basketball people in Greece
Serbian expatriate basketball people in Italy
Serbian expatriate basketball people in Lithuania
Serbian expatriate basketball people in Slovenia
Serbian men's basketball players
Slovenian men's basketball players
Slovenian people of Serbian descent
Small forwards
Ülker G.S.K. basketball players